Kévin Diaz (born 11 April 1983) is a French former professional footballer who played as a striker.

Career
Diaz formerly played amateur football in France for Lusitanos Saint-Maur and Ivry, and has also played professionally in the Netherlands for RBC Roosendaal, FC Eindhoven and Cambuur. He signed for Fortuna Sittard in June 2011. He returned to Lusitanos Saint-Maur in 2013.

Personal life
Born in France, Diaz is of Portuguese descent.

References

1983 births
Living people
Association football forwards
French footballers
French people of Portuguese descent
US Lusitanos Saint-Maur players
US Ivry players
RBC Roosendaal players
FC Eindhoven players
SC Cambuur players
Fortuna Sittard players
Eerste Divisie players
Championnat National 3 players
Championnat National 2 players
French expatriate footballers
Expatriate footballers in the Netherlands
French expatriate sportspeople in the Netherlands